Reborn is the second studio album by French electronic musician Kavinsky, released on 25 March 2022 by Record Makers through Virgin France. Co-produced alongside Gaspard Augé and Victor le Masne, it includes collaborations with Romuald, Cautious Clay, Sébastien Tellier, Kareen Lomax, Prudence and Morgan Phalen. The album was preceded by the singles "Renegade" and "Zenith".

Critical reception

On Metacritic, the album received an aggregate score of 76 out of 100 from five reviews, indicating "generally favorable" reception. Christopher Hamilton-Peach of The Line of Best Fit rated the album eight out of 10 and felt that "summer dancefloor hits carouse with the meticulously mercurial" on the album, summarising it as "a collection that future-proofs Kavinsky's curation of high-end production, addictive earworms and cinematic scope". Writing for Clash, Gem Stokes also gave the album eight out of 10 and called it a "futuristic" mix of synthwave and "youthful, cinematic" influences, concluding that "the album shines bright with promise for [Kavinsky's] futuristic vista".
	
Ana Leorne of Beats Per Minute opined that Kavinsky's retrofuturism "remains as fresh and relevant as ever" and found its tracks to be "insanely cohesive both in terms of writing and production", although "not as simple variations of a same theme but instead as intricate internal dialogues". Thomas Smith, reviewing the album for NME, wrote that while the album "carries the air of a more relaxed creator", "Trigger" and "Renegade" are "as ambitious and futuristic as anything he's ever done". Giving the album three out of five stars, Smith felt that when Kavinsky "eases up on maximalism, the songs flourish and we see a different side to his production prowess".

Track listing

Personnel

Musicians
 Kavinsky – primary artist, producer, writer
 Gaspard Augé – producer (tracks 2, 3, 4 and 11)
 Victor le Masne – producer
 Cautious Clay – vocals (track 3)
 Jade Ly Thai Bach – background vocals (track 5)
 Kareen Lomax – vocals (track 7)
 Morgan Phalen – vocals (track 6, 9, and 10)
 Phoenix – vocoder (track 12)
 Prudence – vocals (track 10)
 Romuald – vocals (track 2)
 Sébastien Tellier – vocals (track 5)
 Adrian Edeline – guitar (track 12)
 Gabriel Malaprade – guitar (track 8)
 Nicolas Bogue – guitar (track 7)
 Adrien Soleiman – saxophone (track 8)
 Corentin Kerdraon – strings (tracks 4, 6, and 11)

Technical
 Antoine Poyeton – engineer, recording
 Louis Bes – assistant engineer, recording
 Michael Declerck – mixing
 Chab – mastering

Artwork
 André Chemetoff – photography
 Thomas Jumin – artwork

Charts

Release history

References

External links

2022 albums
Kavinsky albums
Synthwave albums
Virgin Records albums